
Gmina Pruszcz is an urban-rural gmina (administrative district) in Świecie County, Kuyavian-Pomeranian Voivodeship, in north-central Poland.

Villages
Gmina Pruszcz contains the town of Pruszcz, and villages and settlements of Bagniewko, Bagniewo, Brzeźno, Cieleszyn, Gołuszyce, Grabówko, Grabowo, Konstantowo, Łaszewo, Łowin, Łowinek, Luszkówko, Luszkowo, Małociechowo, Mirowice, Nieciszewo, Niewieścin, Parlin, Rudki, Serock, Topolno, Trępel, Wałdowo, Zawada and Zbrachlin.

Neighbouring gminas
Gmina Pruszcz is bordered by the gminas of Bukowiec, Chełmno, Dobrcz, Koronowo, Świecie, Świekatowo and Unisław.

References
Polish official population figures 2006

Pruszcz
Świecie County